Nanteuil-la-Forêt is a commune in the Marne department in north-eastern France.

Points of interest
Jardin botanique de la Presle

See also
Communes of the Marne department
Montagne de Reims Regional Natural Park

References

Nanteuillaforet